James College is a college at the University of York in the United Kingdom. It is known as the "Sports College" largely due to its prowess on the Sports field but also has a diversity of events that cater to all tastes.

History

James College is named after Lord James of Rusholme, the University of York's first vice-chancellor, and was built in several stages during the 1990s. Initially James was intended to be a postgraduate-only college, however the university began to rapidly expand in size, almost doubling in size from 4,300 to 8,500 students, in 1993, therefore it was decided that the college should become open to undergraduates.

Buildings and services

As of 2019, it consists of thirteen accommodation blocks lettered from "A" to "N" (missing out "I") located across a cable-stayed bridge from Wentworth College and close to the old Goodricke College buildings and the university's sports centre.

There are three types of accommodation; standard houses, ensuite houses and ensuite flats. Blocks ABC are arranged into houses with a small kitchen on the ground floor. There are 3 houses per block which house 16 people (14 standard single rooms and one double room). Blocks DEF are the older-style ensuite blocks which are also arranged into houses with a kitchen on the ground floor.

Blocks GHJKLM are the newest blocks and all have ensuite rooms, consisting of a 'pod' or wet room containing a shower, toilet and sink. Each block is (generally) divided into 6 flats which have a kitchen per flat. The kitchens are shared between 6 and 9 people. In 2009, James College acquired a block from the former site of Goodricke college which has become N block, which is catered, along with ABC blocks. The College Dean and College Tutors live in college.

James has a number of common rooms, hosts the YUSU bar 'The Lounge' and is the closest college to the University Sports centre, playing fields and Health Centre.

Student life
The quads have lent themselves to the most famous James College tradition, "Quad Dash", held in Week 7 of Summer term. Quad Dash models itself on the film Chariots of Fire. It was the brainchild of James College Chair, Fergus Drake. College residents turn out in their hundreds to enjoy a day of sunshine, free beer, quad races, ice cream, bouncy castles and fun.

The college also runs an annual photography competition in conjunction with PhotoSoc, with prizes in a number of categories and dedicated James prizes. The JCR put on annual formal events, normally at Christmas and in the Summer term.

The James College Annual Lecture is delivered by a distinguished speaker on a topic of interest to the college. In recent years these have included:
2010 – Duncan Petrie – 'The Swinging Sixties'
2011 – Steve Bell, award-winning Guardian Cartoonist
2012 – Fergus Drake, Save the Children,- 'The reality of humanitarian aid in a fragile world'

Within the college, a number of 'Taste' events take place each term, where students and members of the college are invited to introduce others to a taster of their own culture through a presentation, demonstration or media. This is normally accompanied, by traditional cuisine and drinks. Alongside these cultural exchange events, the college runs a unique exchange with Morningside College at the Chinese University of Hong Kong, with students from each institution spending a number of terms or a year at the other.  James College and Durham University's Collingwood College enjoy an annual sporting contest and social weekend, with York and Durham taking turns to host the event. James College currently holds the JC Cup, winning a closely fought encounter in Autumn 2012.

James College has two Common Rooms. The Lakeside Common Room is in the A/B/C quad, while James Lodge is in College House, near to the Roger Kirk Centre. The first floor is occupied by college staff.

Sports 
James is known as the "Sports College" on campus, largely due to its supreme prowess in the Sports field. For the 2019 Durham Varsity, James sent eight teams to the competition, more than any other College at the university.

11 November – 13 November saw the 'Battle of the Birds' held between James College and Derwent College.

Junior Common Room Committee 
The JCRC is the student-run body that manages Freshers Week, weekly events, and formals. In 2018, Freshers' Week saw a large focus on Non-Clubbing events as well as the traditional clubbing portfolio.

The 2023 JCRC Executive Committee is:

 Chairs - James Brunt and Ellie Cheshire
 Secretary - Adam Crerar
 Treasurer - Emma Lonnia
 Head of Sports - Andy Marris and Connor Attwood
 Head of Events - Jacob Simms
 Head of Community - Tabitha McGoldrick

List of chairs of the James College JCRC:

 1993 Fergus Drake
 1994 Fergus Drake
 1995 Tim Ayling
 1996 Robin Etherington
 1997 Stewart Buchanan
 1998 Julie Cartwright
 1999 Rebekah Lane
 2000 Jamie Smith
 2001 Alison Rennie
 2002 Andy Henton
 2003 Naomi Brown
 2004 Alice Gamm
 2005 Anouska Widdess
 2006 Anne-Marie Canning
 2007 Alex Clark
 2008 Amber Brittain
 2009 Amber Brittain
 2010 Tim Green
 2011 Emma Bartlett
 2012 Laura Watson
 2013 Dexter Clark
 2013 Dan Ashcroft
 2014 Gareth Dybiec
 2015 Gareth Dybiec
 2016 Max Flynn
 2017 James Durcan
 2018 Alexander Smart
 2019 Jack Edwards
 2020 Sophie Schulze
 2021 Max Stafford
 2022 David Ward

Wildlife
As with the rest of the University's West Campus James College is home to several hundred ducks, geese, other assorted wildfowl, and rabbits.

College staff
Ken Todd was the head of James College from its opening until his retirement in September 2007. Initially the position was titled Provost, but from 2013 this was changed to principal, this has subsequently been changed to head of college. The head of college is a part-time post held by an academic at the university; it is currently held by Paul Summers.

List of provosts:

Mr Ken Todd (1990–2007)
 Dr Neil Lunt (2007–2013)
List of heads/Principals of James College:

 The Revd David Efird (2013–2017)
 Paul Summers (2017–2019)
 Andrew Kerrigan (2019–2020) 

List of deans of James College:

 Mary Macfarlane (2002–2004)
 Christine Hamieh (2004–2006)
 Bernadette Martinez-Hernandez (2006–2008)
 Margaret Hearnden (2008–2011)
 Dan Horsfall (2011–2013)

Assistant heads/College Managers of college are full-time staff that form that primary support worker in the college.

List of assistant heads/College Manager of James College:

 Michael Britland (2013–2021)
 Lenore Klassen (2022–present)
The college administrator deals with admin issues around the college.

List of college administrators:

 Sarah Doughty (2000–2020)
 Lenore Klassen (2020–2022)
 Bryony Cox (2022–present)

References

External links

 JCRC website
 University website page on James College

Colleges of the University of York
1990 establishments in England
Educational institutions established in 1990